Andrew Houston is the name of:

Andrew Houston (born 1846, date of death unknown), Irishman known as the Rossendale Bard
Andrew Jackson Houston (1854–1941), American politician
Andy Houston, NASCAR driver